Bingham Township is one of sixteen townships in Hancock County, Iowa, USA. At the 2000 census, its population was 487.

History
Bingham Township was organized in 1878. Bingham is the name of John Bingham, a pioneer settler from England.

Geography
According to the United States Census Bureau, Bingham Township covers an area of  (91.58 square kilometers); of which  (99.78 percent) is land and  (0.22 percent) is water.

Cities, towns, villages
 Woden

Adjacent townships
 Grant Township, Winnebago County (north)
 Linden Township, Winnebago County (northeast)
 Crystal Township (east)
 Britt Township (southeast)
 Orthel Township (south)
 Wesley Township, Kossuth County (southwest)
 Buffalo Township, Kossuth County (west)
 German Township, Kossuth County (northwest)

Cemeteries
The township contains three cemeteries: Bingham Township, Christian Reformed and Immanuel Lutheran Church.

Major highways
  Iowa Highway 111

School districts
 Titonka Consolidated School District
 Woden-Crystal Lake Community School District

Political districts
 Iowa's 4th congressional district
 State House District 11
 State Senate District 6

References
 United States Census Bureau 2008 TIGER/Line Shapefiles
 United States Board on Geographic Names (GNIS)
 United States National Atlas

External links
 US-Counties.com
 City-Data.com

Townships in Hancock County, Iowa
Townships in Iowa
1878 establishments in Iowa
Populated places established in 1878